Rapepat Nakphet (born October 30, 1986) is a professional footballer from Thailand.

External links
 http://www.airforceunited.com/players/p22.html

1986 births
Living people
Rapepat Nakphet
Rapepat Nakphet
Association football midfielders
Rapepat Nakphet
Rapepat Nakphet
Rapepat Nakphet
Rapepat Nakphet